Kieran Stephen Larbi Allen-Djilali (born 22 January 1991), more commonly known as Kieran Djilali, is an English footballer who plays for Three Bridges.

Club career

Crystal Palace and loans
Born in Lambeth, London, Djilali came through the academy at Crystal Palace, going on trial with Manchester United in mid-2007. He made his Palace debut at 17, followed quickly by a string of first-team appearances in which he impressed. A year later he moved to League Two side Chesterfield, where he scored his first career goal in a game against Darlington on 21 November 2009.

He returned to Crystal Palace following his loan spell on 12 January 2010, and scored his first goal for Palace against Doncaster Rovers on 27 February 2010. He began the following season in Palace's first team but dropped out as manager George Burley sought to bring in more experienced players. In February, he returned to table-topping Chesterfield for a second loan spell, helping them to win the League Two title. When his contract at parent club Crystal Palace expired, he opted to leave Selhurst Park in the summer of 2011 to seek more game time.

AFC Wimbledon
In July 2011, Djilali played on trial for Scunthorpe United, but ended up signing for League Two club AFC Wimbledon on 26 August. On 3 September, he made his debut for the club, against Port Vale. On 10 March 2012, he scored his first goal for the club, against Dagenham & Redbridge. In May 2012, Djilali was released from the club as his contract expired.

Portsmouth
On 16 August 2012, Djilali signed a one-month contract with League One side Portsmouth. He made his debut in a 1–1 draw with Bournemouth on the opening day of the League One season, but was released after just two weeks due to Portsmouth's tight wage budget, with manager Michael Appleton putting Djilali's release down to his lack of fitness.

Return to AFC Wimbledon
On 16 November 2012, Djilali re-signed for AFC Wimbledon on a short-term deal. Manager Neal Ardley said of the move: "Kieran has been with us for a month now. He has trained well and showed a very good attitude. He has the potential to play at a higher level but first he needs to prove himself with us. With the busy winter period coming on, we thought we should augment the squad and take the chance to have a good look at him in competitive action." Djilali was released by AFC Wimbledon on 31 January 2013.

Sligo Rovers
In March 2013, Djilali signed a contract with League of Ireland champions Sligo Rovers. He made his debut on 8 March, against Derry City. On 18 March, he scored his first goal for Sligo, against Bray Wanderers.

Limerick
In July 2014, Djilali signed with League of Ireland side Limerick.

Cork City
On 21 November 2014, Cork City announced the signing of Kieran Djilali from Munster rivals, Limerick ahead of the 2015 season. The winger made his debut as a substitute against former club, Sligo Rovers in a 1–1 draw at The Showgrounds. He scored his first goal for the Rebel Army after coming on late against Bray Wanderers, scoring the vital winning goal in a dramatic 1–0 victory.

Dulwich Hamlet
After leaving Cork City, and following a period out of the game whilst he recovered from injury, Djilali joined Dulwich Hamlet of the Isthmian League Premier Division in September 2016, going on to make his debut as a substitute against Grays Athletic in the Isthmian League Cup on the 13 September 2016.

Three Bridges
After making three substitute appearances in all competitions for Dulwich Hamlet, Djilali joined Three Bridges of the Isthmian League South Division on 17 October 2016.

Honours
Chesterfield
Football League Two (1): 2010–11

Sligo Rovers
FAI Cup (1): 2013
Setanta Sports Cup (1): 2014

Statistics

A.  The "Other" column constitutes appearances (including substitutions) and goals in either the Football League Trophy, the Setanta Cup and the UEFA Champions League.

References

External links

1991 births
Living people
Footballers from Lambeth
English footballers
English people of Moroccan descent
Association football wingers
Crystal Palace F.C. players
Crawley Town F.C. players
Chesterfield F.C. players
AFC Wimbledon players
Portsmouth F.C. players
English Football League players
National League (English football) players
Black British sportspeople
Sligo Rovers F.C. players
Limerick F.C. players
Cork City F.C. players
Dulwich Hamlet F.C. players
League of Ireland players